Neurostrota cupreella is a moth of the family Gracillariidae. It is known from Jamaica and Cuba.

References

Gracillariinae